Priluzsky District (Luzdor rajon) is an administrative district (raion), one of the twelve in the Komi Republic, Russia. It is located in the south of the republic. Its administrative center is the rural locality (a selo) of Obyachevo. As of the 2010 Census, the total population of the district was 20,737, with the population of Obyachevo accounting for 27.5% of that number.

Administrative and municipal status
Within the framework of administrative divisions, Priluzsky District is one of the twelve in the Komi Republic. The district is divided into fourteen selo administrative territories and two settlement administrative territories, which comprise eighty-eight rural localities. As a municipal division, the district is incorporated as Priluzsky Municipal District. Its sixteen administrative territories are incorporated as sixteen rural settlements within the municipal district. The selo of Obyachevo serves as the administrative center of both the administrative and municipal district.

References

Notes

Sources

Districts of the Komi Republic
